Xinjiang Province is a historical administrative area of Northwest China, between 1884 and 1955.

Periods during which various boundaries of Xinjiang Province have been defined include:
 Xinjiang Province (Qing) (1884–1912).
 Xinjiang Province (Republic of China) (1912–1992) The actual control of the region by Republic of China was interrupted between 1933 and 1946 and ended entirely in 1949, but after the Central Government of the Republic of China moved to Taiwan, the government of Xinjiang Province (Republic of China) were abolished in 1992.
 Xinjiang Autonomous Province (Republic of China) (1933–1944) a semi-independent local government established by Sheng Shicai (盛世才, Pinyin: Shèng Shìcái) in Xinjiang Province, Republic of China.
 Xinjiang Province (People's Republic of China) (1949–1955) was replaced in 1955 by the newly established Xinjiang Uyghur Autonomous Region.